Brannon Run is a  long 1st order tributary to the Allegheny River in Venango County, Pennsylvania.

Course
Brannon Run rises about 2 miles northwest of Oil City, Pennsylvania, and then flows south and southwest to join the Allegheny River at Reno.

Watershed
Brannon Run drains  of area, receives about 44.4 in/year of precipitation, and has a wetness index of 357.00 and is about 77% forested.

References

Additional Maps

Rivers of Pennsylvania
Rivers of Venango County, Pennsylvania
Tributaries of the Allegheny River